Presence Switzerland is an official Swiss organisation and part of the Federal Department of Foreign Affairs, which aims is to promote Swiss interests. The organisation's name is not to be confused with Switzerland Tourism, the owner of the MySwitzerland website.

Presence Switzerland manages an eight-language information website about the country, describing its history, institutions and politics. It also hosts the Swiss pavilions at the World's fairs, as well as the House of Switzerland.

See also 
 Pro Helvetia
 Swissinfo

External links 
 Official website

Foreign relations of Switzerland
Federal Department of Foreign Affairs
News agencies based in Switzerland